Newcastle is a 2008 Australian drama film set in the city of Newcastle, in New South Wales.

Plot
Young surfer Jesse has always been in the shadow of his older brother Victor, who tried to become a champion surfer and failed. Jesse, his friends — Nathan, Andy and Scotty — and his brother Fergus (who has a crush on Andy, which is reciprocated), along with Deb and Leah, all go on a camping-surfing trip to a remote beach.

But Victor shows up, things get competitive, and tragedy hits: There is a severe accident in which Andy is seriously injured and Victor is killed. After the funeral, Fergus and Jesse bond on a night under the stars, and the film ends on a happier note, with Jesse as a competitor in a junior surf comp.

Cast
 Lachlan Buchanan as Jesse Hoff
 Xavier Samuel as Fergus Hoff
 Reshad Strik as Victor Hoff
 Shane Jacobson as Reggie
 Israel Cannan as Scotty
 Joy Smithers as Flora
 Gigi Edgley as Sandra
 Rebecca Breeds as Leah
 Barry Otto as Gramps
 Kirk Jenkins as Andy
 Anthony Hayes as Danny
 Ben Milliken as Nathan
 James Triglone as Billy
 Debra Ades as Debra
 Zachary Garred as Kurt

Reception

Box office
Newcastle grossed $213,563 at the box office in Australia.

Critical reception
The review aggregator website Rotten Tomatoes reported an approval rating of 61% with an average score of 5.63/10, based on 18 reviews.

See also
Cinema of Australia

References

External links
 

2000s coming-of-age drama films
2008 films
Australian coming-of-age drama films
Australian LGBT-related films
Films set in New South Wales
LGBT-related coming-of-age films
Australian surfing films
2008 drama films
Films scored by Michael Yezerski
Films shot in New South Wales
2008 LGBT-related films
2000s English-language films
2000s Australian films